"Trying to Live My Life Without You" or "Tryin' to Live My Life Without You" is a song written by Eugene Frank Williams, originally popularized by soul singer Otis Clay. In early 1973 it reached #102 on the Billboard Bubbling Under chart. On February 17, 1973, Clay performed the song on Soul Train. It has since been covered by several other artists, most notably Bob Seger on his 1981 Nine Tonight album, Dr. Feelgood on their 1982 Fast Women & Slow Horses album, Brinsley Schwarz and at live performances by The California Honeydrops.

Writing
The song is sung from the point of view of a man who is addressing his former lover.  During the song's verses, the narrator tells of various habits he has had over his lifetime, such as smoking "five packs of cigarettes a day", drinking "four or five bottles of wine."
and womanizing with many young women. In the song, he states that breaking those former habits was difficult, but not nearly as difficult as getting over the girl and forgetting the love they shared.

Chart performance

Bob Seger version
Bob Seger's cover of the song is the most successful version of the song, reaching number five on the pop singles charts.  It is known for Seger's spoken prelude on top of the bassline: "Alright, you guys feel funky tonight? ... This is an old Memphis song, old Memphis song...."  The Nine Tonight liner notes claim that Seger's saxophone player, Alto Reed, played all the saxophones heard on that song, at the same time.  Most likely this is possible from studio overdubbing on top of the live performance.

Record World said it is a "soulful rocker that captures Seger at his best."

Chart performance

Weekly charts

Year-end charts

References

1972 singles
2000 singles
Otis Clay songs
Hi Records singles
1981 singles
Bob Seger songs
John Farnham songs
Capitol Records singles
1972 songs
Song recordings produced by Bob Seger
Song recordings produced by Punch Andrews